Gareth Jones (4 December 1979 – 16 June 2008) was a Welsh rugby union player who played as a scrum-half for Neath rugby club until his death in 2008.

Club career 
Jones started his career with Glyncoch and then progressed to play for Beddau and Pontypridd, before making his debut for Neath in 2006 against Newport. He was also a part-time decorator.

Death 
After sustaining an injury to his neck during a game against Cardiff in the Premier Division in a ruck on 20 April 2008, Jones was taken to the University Hospital of Wales for treatment. During his time there, he received operations and treatment to help with his injury, but died on the afternoon of 16 June.

References

1979 births
2008 deaths
Pontypridd RFC players
Rugby union players from Pontypridd
Sport deaths in Wales
Welsh rugby union players
Rugby union scrum-halves